The Copa de la Reina (Queen's Cup) is an annual cup competition for Spanish women's association football teams organized by the Royal Spanish Football Federation. Its full name is Campeonato de España - Copa de Su Majestad la Reina (Championship of Spain - Her Majesty the Queen's Cup).

History
The tournament's first edition took place in 1983, five years before the Spanish women's league was created. Up to the creation of the women's league the winners of this cup were crowned as Spanish football champions.

From 2004 to 2017, it was played knockout tournament taking place once the season is over as top eight clubs at the end of the league season qualify for it. Since 2018, all the 16 teams of the first division joined the competition, that started to be played during the league season.

The 2021–22 season featured 52 clubs; all 16 teams team in Primera División, all 32 teams from Segunda División Pro, and the four promoted teams from Primera Nacional de Fútbol. Reserve teams are excluded from participating in the tournament.

Finals
In 1981 and 1982 two editions were held under the name Copa Reina Sofía and won by Karbo. The first official recognized version of the tournament was the 1983 edition.

Until 1988, just before the creation of the national league, the winners were claimed as Spanish champions.

Winners 

Marked in italic those teams that won the league championship that season

See also
 Primera División (women)

References

External links
 Copa de la Reina at RFEF website

 
Spa
Women's football competitions in Spain
Reina